Antara Dua Darjat (Between Two Classes) is a 1960 Singaporean melodrama film directed by and starring Malaysian silver-screen legend P. Ramlee.

Plot
The movie opens during a thunderstorm in a house called Orchid Villa. The house has been empty for a long time and sets the setting for a couple on their honeymoon. The couple, Tengku Mukri and Tengku Zaleha are accompanied by the former's good friend, Dr. Tengku Aziz. The night is interrupted when Tengku Zaleha is awoken by a voice calling out her name and upon searching, she encounters a dark figure by the window. Startled, she screams and faints, awaking her husband and Dr. Tengku Aziz. Both men search the premises but find nothing to explain Tengku Zaleha's situation. The dark figure walks home and is confronted by his cousin. His name is Ghazali and as explained in the conversation with his cousin, he has made numerous trips to Orchid Villa. That was the home of Tengku Zaleha, who we now learn, is dead. As he looks on in the rain, he tells the story.

Tengku Zaleha and Ghazali met on rainy day when her car got stuck in the mud. Upon her return to Orchid Villa, she is questioned by her father as to why she is soaking wet and when she told the story, she is reprimanded for socialising with people below her status. He reiterates of their royal lineage and how shameful it would be for her to even be seen with non-royal people. Tengku Zaleha then has a birthday party, to which Ghazali and his friends have been hired as the band. An attraction develops between them and when her father isn't home, Tengku Zaleha takes the opportunity to leave the house and meet Ghazali. During the turn of events, Ghazali is hired as the piano teacher for Tengku Zaleha. Their affection for each other grows but due to their differing social standings, she has to meet him in secret. One night, she is caught and is violently taken away whilst Ghazali is horribly beaten. Tengku Zaleha is presumed dead whilst Ghazali survives the assault but is burdened by the guilt of her murder and loss of the woman he loves.

Back in the Orchid Villa, Tengku Zaleha is persuaded to play the piano but finds that one of the keys is out of tune. Tengku Zaleha suggests getting a piano tuner to repair it. When he is called upon, Ghazali is then forced by his cousin, Sudin, to take the job. He is perturbed by the sight of Tengku Zaleha who doesn't seem to recognise him as he enters the house. He finishes the job and as he is about to leave, Tengku Zaleha starts playing the song he had taught her when she was taking piano lessons. Sensing something amiss, Dr. Tengku Aziz decides to do a little investigating the following day and drops by Sudin's house to find out more about Ghazali. Sudin then tells him the whole story of how Tengku Zaleha was killed which drove Ghazali into the deep depression he was suffering. That night, Tengku Mukri is called away to Singapore and asks Dr. Tengku Aziz to keep an eye on Tengku Zaleha. She sneaks out in the middle of the night and is careful not to wake Dr. Tengku Aziz up but he sees her anyway and keeps quiet. She runs to the last meeting place she had met Ghazali before they were horribly separated and there, she finds him again. At first, she keeps up the pretense but then she begins to tell him the story of the night they were separated. After she had been brought back to Orchid Villa, her brother and father had given her something, an injection by a doctor to render her unconscious. When she awoke, she found herself in Singapore with her family. This time, her mother tries to fight for her but is killed by her half-brother and he is subsequently arrested, tried for the murder and sentenced to death. These turn of events had driven their father insane and he is then hospitalised in a mental asylum. Afterwards, she is visited by another Tengku and friend of her father who tells her that she had been promised marriage to Tengku Mukri by their fathers. He shows proof of the contract they made which left Tengku Zaleha without much choice but to go through the wedding.

After the wedding, she is asked by Tengku Mukri if she wanted to get away citing places as far away as Paris and Tokyo. But Tengku Zaleha said the only place she'd like to go to is Johore Bahru, which is where Orchid Villa is located. In another scene, we discover that Tengku Mukri is actually having an affair and intends to divorce Tengku Zaleha once he is able to steal all of her money away. After he returns to Orchid Villa, he is persuaded by Dr. Tengku Aziz to divorce Tengku Zaleha because he feels it is only right that she and Ghazali be together. Tengku Mukri agrees on condition that the man Tengku Zaleha marries is of noble blood like he is. When he finds out that it is Ghazali, of non royal blood, he refuses and throws Dr. Tengku Aziz out of the house because he feels that Dr. Tengku Aziz has insulted him for not having the same opinion of royalty as he does. He wants him to go back to Singapore and drives him off but then causes a road accident and tries to drive him off the road. When that fails, he shoots him and Dr. Tengku Aziz disappears in the bushes. He then takes his gun and hunts Ghazali down, intending to kill him but is stopped by first, Ghazali's mother and then Tengku Zaleha. He tries to shoot again but the gun jams and taking the opportunity, Ghazali pounces upon him and tries to wrestle the gun out of his hands. A shot goes off in the air and Tengku Mukri falls to the ground. With all of their resistances out of the way, Tengku Zaleha and Ghazali are at least able to be together.

Cast
 P. Ramlee as Ghazali
 Saadiah as Tengku Zaleha
 Ahmad Nisfu as Tengku Karim 
 Kuswadinata as Tengku Hassan
 S. Shamsuddin as Sudin, who is in love with Munah
 Yusof Latiff as Tengku Aziz
 S. Kadarisman as Tengku Mukri
 Aini Jasmin as Puteh
 Mariam Baharum as Munah 
 Zainon Fiji as Mak Jah
 Rahimah Alias as Yang Chik, Zalehah's mother, who was murdered by Tengku Hassan
 Rahmah Rahmat as Normah
 Mustarjo as Wak Karto, who is trying to woo Munah
 Kemat Hassan as Tengku Ismail
 M. Rafiee as the driver
 Ali Fiji as Ali
 Kassim Masdor as Kassim
 S. Sudarmaji as Mahadi

Songs
 Getaran Jiwa
 Selamat Panjang Umur
 Alunan Biola

References

External links
 Antara Dua Darjat at the Cinema Malaysia
 
 Antara Dua Darjat / 1960 - Filem Malaysia

1960 films
1960s musical drama films
Malay-language films
Malaysian drama films
Singaporean drama films
Melodrama films
Films directed by P. Ramlee
Malaysian black-and-white films
Singaporean black-and-white films
Films about social class
Films with screenplays by P. Ramlee
Films scored by P. Ramlee
Malay Film Productions films
Films shot in Singapore
Films set in Singapore
1960 drama films